Castilian or Castillian may refer to:

 Castile, a historic region of Spain
 Castilian people, an ethnic group from Castile
 Castilian languages, a branch of the West Iberian languages consisting of all linguistic varieties descended from Old Spanish
 Spanish language, often known in Spain as the Castilian language, a Romance language that originated in Castile
 Castilian Spanish, the variety or dialect of the Spanish language spoken specifically in Castile
 Crown of Castile, a former state on the Iberian Peninsula
 Kingdom of Castile, a former kingdom on the Iberian Peninsula
 Castile and León, an autonomous community of Spain
 Castile–La Mancha, an autonomous community of Spain
 SS Castilian, a 1919 British ship
 The Castilian, a 1963 film

See also
 Castile (disambiguation)
 Castellano (disambiguation)
 Nationalities of Spain (disambiguation)

Language and nationality disambiguation pages